Malta Mill, Middleton is a former cotton spinning mill in the Mills Hill area of Chadderton, Greater Manchester. It lies alongside the Rochdale Canal. It was built in 1904 as a new mule mill, by F. W. Dixon The engine stopped in 1963. The building still stands.

Prior to 1933 boundary changes the mill lay within Middleton.

History

Historically a part of Lancashire, Middleton took its name from being situated in the centre of several circumjacent settlements. In 1770, Middleton was a village of 20 houses; during the 18th and 19th centuries it grew into a thriving and populous seat of textile manufacture, so much so that Middleton was granted borough status in 1886.

During the Middle Ages, Middleton was a centre of domestic flannel and woollen cloth production.
Industrial scale textile manufacture was introduced to Middleton as a result of the Industrial Revolution. Middleton became a centre for silk production in the 18th century, which developed into a cotton spinning industry by the mid 19th-century and which continued through to the mid-20th century. Rochdale rose to prominence during the 19th century as a major mill town and centre for textile manufacture during the Industrial Revolution. It was a boomtown of the Industrial Revolution, and amongst the first ever industrialised towns. The Rochdale Canal—one of the major navigable broad canals of the United Kingdom—was a highway of commerce during this time used for the haulage of cotton, wool, coal to and from the area. In 1882, Rochdale the home of industrial co-operatives, embraced the joint stock limited company and new mills were financed and built. Its ownership model was slightly different from that of Oldham, and more shares remained in the hands of the operatives. The Rochdale Limiteds were some of the first to adopt ring spinning.

Malta Mill was one of a cluster of mills built in 1904–05.

The industry peaked in 1912 when it produced 8 billion yards of cloth. The Great War of 1914–18 halted the supply of raw cotton, and the British government encouraged its colonies to build mills to spin and weave cotton. The war over, Lancashire never regained its markets. The independent mills were struggling. The Bank of England set up the Lancashire Cotton Corporation in 1929 to attempt to rationalise and save the industry. Malta Mill, Middleton was one of 104 mills bought by the LCC, and one of the 53 mills that survived through to 1950. The mill closed in 1963.

Malta Mill still stands in 2010 and is used by many businesses; including for document storage and as a bonded warehouse.

Architecture 
Designed by F. W. Dixon and built in 1905. A substantial building from Accrington brick.

Power 
Driven by a 1200 hp vertical triple expansion engine by Buckley & Taylor, 1904. It had a 22 ft flywheel, 32 ropes operating at 72rpm. Its cylinders, 20"HP, 32"IP, 52"LP, had a 4 ft stroke. It was steamed at 160psi. 72rpm.  22 ft flywheel, 32 ropes.  Corliss valves on all cylinders.  The air pump was driven from LP crosshead.  It had an eight bearing crankshaft.

Equipment 
110,160 mule spindles in 1915.

Owners
Malta Mill Company
Lancashire Cotton Corporation (1930s–1963)

See also 

Textile manufacturing

References

Bibliography

External links
 www.cottontown.org
 www.spinningtheweb.org.uk

Textile mills owned by the Lancashire Cotton Corporation
Textile mills in the Metropolitan Borough of Oldham
Middleton, Greater Manchester
Buildings and structures in Chadderton